Alexander Crawford McNaughton (born 1 December 1953) is a Scottish retired footballer, best remembered for his time as a forward in the Scottish League with Dunfermline Athletic and Queen's Park. He also played for Stenhousemuir, Ayr United, Clydebank, Clyde and East Stirlingshire. He later embarked on a playing and coaching career in Scottish lower-league football.

Personal life 
McNaughton attended Calder Primary School and Dalziel High School. In 1987, McNaughton was appointed Principal Teacher of PE at Kincorth Academy.

References

Scottish footballers
Scottish Football League players
Queen's Park F.C. players
Association football forwards
1953 births
Footballers from Motherwell
Clydebank F.C. (1965) players
Clyde F.C. players
Stenhousemuir F.C. players
Dunfermline Athletic F.C. players
Ayr United F.C. players
East Stirlingshire F.C. players
Deveronvale F.C. players
Cove Rangers F.C. players
Scotland amateur international footballers
People educated at Dalziel High School
Highland Football League players
Stenhousemuir F.C. non-playing staff
Living people

External links 

 Sandy McNaughton at dafc.co.uk